The Made in Denmark is a professional golf tournament on the European Tour that is played annually in Denmark.

History
The inaugural tournament was played from 14 to 17 August 2014 at the HimmerLand Golf & Spa Resort, in Farsø, Denmark. HimmerLand hosted the event from 2014 to 2017. In 2015, the tournament featured the shortest par-3 hole in European Tour history, when the 16th hole played just  in the final round.

In 2018, Made in Denmark was played at Silkeborg Ry Golfklub, before returning to HimmerLand Golf & Spa Resort in 2019. During the Made in Denmark Challenge in June 2018, the organisation behind the tournament announced that Made in Denmark would continue for another five years, until 2023.

Winners

See also
Nordic Open, previous European Tour event in Denmark

Notes

References

External links
Coverage on the European Tour's official site

European Tour events
Golf tournaments in Denmark
Sport in Aalborg
Recurring sporting events established in 2014
2014 establishments in Denmark